Tuzovskiy, also sometimes transliterated as Tuzovsky, is a shield volcano located in the northern part of Kamchatka Peninsula, Russia. It comprises three shield volcanoes from which Tuzovsky is the higher one.

See also
 List of volcanoes in Russia

References 
 

Mountains of the Kamchatka Peninsula
Volcanoes of the Kamchatka Peninsula
Shield volcanoes of Russia
Holocene shield volcanoes
Holocene Asia